The 1997 NC State Wolfpack football team represented North Carolina State University in the 1997 NCAA Division I-A football season. The team was led by fifth-year head coach Mike O'Cain and played its home games at Carter–Finley Stadium. They finished the season with a 6–5 record overall and a 3–5 record in Atlantic Coast Conference (ACC) games.

Schedule

References

NC State
NC State Wolfpack football seasons
NC State Wolfpack football